Joseph William Swain de Graft-Johnson (6 October 1933 – 22 April 1999) was a Ghanaian engineer, academic and politician. He served as Vice-President of Ghana from 1979 to 1981.

Early life and education
Joseph de Graft-Johnson was born on 6 October 1933 in Cape Coast, Gold Coast to Fante parents. He attended Mfantsipim School. He received his bachelor's degree in Civil Engineering from the University of Leeds. In 1960, he received a master's degree in Highway Engineering from the University of Birmingham. He received his PhD in Soil Mechanics from the University of California, Berkeley in 1965.

Career
He first worked with a London engineering firm, where his projects included the building of a Brazilian power plant and the extension of an airport in London. de Graft-Johnson practised as an engineer in Ghana. He was a lecturer at of the Kwame Nkrumah University of Science and Technology at Kumasi and was later promoted to Senior Lecturer, then associate professor in 1968. In 1969, he became the Director of the Buildings and Roads Research Institute. In 1974, he was one of ten members appointed to the Ghana Highways Authority and later, sat on the board of directors. He was also one of the founding members of the Ghana Institution of Engineers (GhIE), of which he was the President from 1977 to 1978. He was a consultant to the Government of Zambia where he advised on the set-up of the Building Research and Development Institute in Lusaka.

Politics
During the era of military rule under the Supreme Military Council, he was involved in opposition to continued military rule as he was then President of the GhIE, one of many professional bodies in Ghana opposing the military government. He suffered personal attacks because of this. He was a member of the 1978 Constituent Assembly established to write the 1979 Constitution of the Third Republic. de Graft-Johnson joined the People's National Party (PNP) when it was founded in 1979. This was after the ban on political parties imposed in 1972 by the National Redemption Council was lifted. The PNP won the elections and he became the first ever Vice President of Ghana in the Limann government. The government was overthrown by coup d'état on 31 December 1981. He left for exile in London, England  after the coup.

Personal life 
He was married to Lily Anna Sekyi and they had 5 children.

Death
De Graft-Johnson died on 22 April 1999 in London at the age of 65. After his funeral service at the Wesley Methodist Cathedral, he was buried in Cape Coast.

Publications

Literature
de Graft Okyere, Letitia (2022) The First Vice President: A Biography of JWS de Graft-Johnson MacSwain Publishing

References

1933 births
1999 deaths
Fante people
Vice-presidents of Ghana
Leaders ousted by a coup
Academic staff of Kwame Nkrumah University of Science and Technology
People's National Party (Ghana) politicians
20th-century Ghanaian engineers
Ghanaian Methodists
Mfantsipim School alumni
Alumni of the University of Leeds
Alumni of the University of Birmingham
UC Berkeley College of Engineering alumni